The Malta International  is an international badminton tournament held in Malta. This tournament has been a Future Series. Maltese National Badminton Championships already started in 1953.

Winners

Performances by nation

References 

Badminton tournaments
Badminton in Malta
Sports competitions in Malta